The Great Horde (Uluğ Orda) was a rump state of the Golden Horde that existed from the mid-15th century to 1502. It was centered at the core of the Golden Horde at Sarai. Both the Khanate of Astrakhan and the Khanate of Crimea broke away from the Great Horde throughout its existence, and were hostile to the Great Horde. The defeat of the forces of the Great Horde at the Great Stand on the Ugra River by Ivan III of Russia marked the end of the "Tatar yoke" over Russia.

Decline of the Golden Horde
The Golden Horde of Jochi had been showing cracks in the 14th century, with periods of chaos within the polity. It was united by Tokhtamysh in the 1390s, but the invasion of Timur during this time further weakened the Horde. The death of Edigu (the last person to ever unite the Horde) in 1419 marked one of the final steps of the decay of the Golden Horde, which fractured into the separate states of the Nogai Khanate, the Kazan Khanate, and later the Kasimov Khanate, which had separated itself from Kazan. Each one of these Khanates claimed to be the legitimate successor to the Golden Horde. The Great Horde itself was centered on the Golden Horde's national center of Sarai, with its territory being led by four tribes - the Qiyat, the Manghud, the Sicivud, and the Qonqirat. The Great Horde was originally simply referred to as the Orda, or Horde, but it became increasingly important for the disparate hordes in the region to be distinguished from each other, which led to the first mention of the "Great Horde" in sources in the 1430s. The name "Great Horde" might have been used to directly link the now greatly reduced administrative center of the Horde to the original greatness of the Golden Horde.

Joint rule of Küchük Muhammad and Sayid Ahmad I
Starting from the 1430s, both Küchük Muhammad and Sayid Ahmad I were in power within the Horde of Sarai. During this time, the Horde lost control of Crimea as Hacı I Giray (brother of Devlet Berdi, who had previously wrested control of Crimea for himself from the Golden Horde) had kicked out authority from Sarai in August 1449. This is accepted as the way the Crimean Khanate became independent, which kicked off a rivalry between Crimea and the Great Horde. Küchük Muhammad drove out Ulugh Muhammad from the heartland of the Golden Horde in 1438, being proclaimed Khan in Sarai. Throughout the rules of Küchük Muhammad and Sayid Ahmad I, the Tatars tried to force their Russian subjects to pay taxes, invading them in 1449, 1450, 1451 and 1452. These attacks led to retaliation from the Polish-Lithuanian Commonwealth, who allied with the Crimean Khanate. At the same time, envoys from Lithuanian nobles who were unhappy being under a Polish-dominant Commonwealth brought gifts to Sayid Ahmad, who invaded Poland-Lithuania in 1453. In 1455, the Crimeans again attacked Sarai, forcing Sayid Ahmad to flee to Kiev. However, a force led by Andrzej Odrowąż marched upon Kiev and captured him, leading him to die in prison. Further raids include a Tatar raid on Podolia in 1457 (ending in victory for the Tatars) and one in 1459 on Muscovy (ending in a victory for the Muscovites)

Descendants of Küchük Muhammad
Küchük Muhammad was succeeded by his son Mahmud bin Küchük in 1459. Mahmud was usurped by his brother Ahmed Khan bin Küchük in 1465. Mahmud headed to Astrakhan, seceding and forming the Astrakhan Khanate. This led to the creation of a rivalry between the two Khanates, ending with Ahmed's descendants occupying the throne of Astrakhan in 1502. In 1469, Ahmed attacked and killed the Uzbek Abu'l-Khayr Khan. In the summer of 1470, Ahmed organized an attack against Moldavia, the Kingdom of Poland, and Lithuania. By August 20, the Moldavian forces under Stephen the Great defeated the Tatars at the battle of Lipnic. By the 1470s, Muscovy had stopped paying tribute to Sarai, but continued to maintain diplomatic relations with them. In 1474 and 1476, Ahmed insisted that Ivan III of Russia recognize the khan as his overlord. In 1480, Ahmed organized a military campaign against Moscow, resulting in a face off between two opposing armies known as the Great Stand on the Ugra River. Ahmed judged the conditions unfavorable and retreated. This incident formally ended the "Tatar Yoke" over Rus' lands. On 6 January 1481, Ahmed was killed by Ibak Khan, the prince of the Khanate of Sibir, and Nogays at the mouth of the Donets River.

The Crimean Khanate, which had become a vassal state of the Ottoman Empire in 1475, subjugated what remained of the Great Horde, sacking Sarai in 1502. After seeking refuge in Lithuania, Sheikh Ahmed, last Khan of the Horde, died in prison in Kaunas some time after 1504. According to other sources, he was released from the Lithuanian prison in 1527.

Khans of the Great Horde
 Küchük Muhammad (1435-1459)
 Mahmud bin Küchük (1459-1465)
 Ahmed Khan bin Küchük (1465-1481)
 Murtaza Khan as co-ruler with Sheikh Ahmed (1481-1498)
 Murtaza Khan (1498-1499)
 Sheikh Ahmed (1499-1502)

Other uses 
The Crimean Khanate considered its state as the heir and legal successor of the Golden Horde and Desht-i Kipchak, called themselves khans of "the Great Horde, the Great State and the Throne of the Crimea".

References 

 

Former countries in Europe
Medieval Russia
Golden Horde
15th century in Europe
15th century in Asia
History of the North Caucasus